The ChubbChubbs! is a 2002 American computer-animated short film by Sony Pictures Imageworks. It was directed by Eric Armstrong, produced by Jacquie Barnbrook, and written by Jeff Wolverton.

The ChubbChubbs! won the Academy Award for Best Animated Short Film in 2003.

Plot
Meeper, the janitor of an alien pub called the Ale-E-Inn, has higher aspirations—a karaoke performer. After he accidentally electrocutes a singer, he is ejected from the pub. Outside, he is told by an incautious Gungan that "The ChubbChubbs are coming!" Meeper sees aircraft land in the distance, and huge, weapon-bearing monsters exit the craft. He assumes these are the ChubbChubbs.

Meeper rushes to warn the pub, and some chicks he finds pecking at the ground outside, but each of his attempts further injures the singer. Once the patrons are finally warned by a different visitor, the pub is promptly emptied due to said patrons taking off in panic, leaving Meeper behind during the process. When the monsters begin closing in to the pub, Meeper hides the chicks under his bucket in an attempt to save them. He then launches into a rendition of "Why Can't We Be Friends?" until, caught up in the song, he accidentally trips over the bucket, revealing the chicks. The monsters flee, screaming, "It's the ChubbChubbs!" The chicks reveal their razor sharp teeth and devour the monsters, who are actually known as Zyzaks. They gather around Meeper, who says, "So... You guys into karaoke?"

As the credits roll, Meeper and the ChubbChubbs sing a rewrite of Aretha Franklin's "Respect" in the pub. When the song is finished, there is dead silence. The ChubbChubbs glare and reveal their teeth in a sense of threat, and the crowd hastily bursts into applause.

Cast
 Brad Simonsen as Meeper
 Jeff Wolverton as the ChubbChubbs
 Mortonette Jenkins as Singing Diva 
 Peter Lurie as Zyzaks
 Rick Zieff as Bouncer
 Dustin Adair, Eric Armstrong, Yakov Baytler, Mary Biondo, Sumit Das, Layne Friedman, Robert Gordon, Sully Jacome-Wilkes, Franco Pietrantonio, Rick Richards, Chance Thomas, Julie Zackary as Glorfs
 Evan Wu as Various aliens

Production
The short was "originally conceived as a pipeline test to help determine the studio’s strengths and weaknesses in producing all-CG animation within the Imageworks production environment."

Release
The ChubbChubbs! was theatrically released on July 3, 2002, along with Men in Black II. Due to its success, it was re-released on July 19 of that year with Stuart Little 2.

The short got a DVD release on November 26, 2002, as a bonus feature also attached to Men in Black II. On April 11, 2003, the short was released on its own DVD, and with a running time of 5 minutes, 37 seconds is considered likely the briefest DVD ever released.
The ChubbChubbs! and its sequel The ChubbChubbs Save Xmas were released on October 9, 2007, for the first time on Blu-ray, attached as a bonus to Surf's Up.

Accolades
Academy Award for Best Animated Short Film

Cancelled adaptations
A feature-length animated film and a television series based on the short were in development in 2003 at Sony Pictures Animation. Dan Wilson and Dave Gilbreth had been hired to write the film's screenplay, but since then, there has been no further news about the projects.

Sequel
A sequel, The ChubbChubbs Save Xmas, was theatrically released on August 8, 2007, along with TriStar Pictures Daddy Day Camp, and was produced by Columbia Pictures and Sony Pictures Animation.

See also
2002 in film
List of fictional aliens

References

External links

 Official website at Sony Pictures Animation
 
 

2002 animated films
2002 computer-animated films
2002 science fiction films
2002 short films
2002 films
2000s American animated films
2000s animated short films
Best Animated Short Academy Award winners
Columbia Pictures short films
Columbia Pictures animated short films
American animated short films
Sony Pictures Animation short films
2000s English-language films